Armando Torrea (born April 14, 1983), is a Mexican actor.

Filmography

References

External links

1983 births
Living people
People from Mexicali
Mexican male telenovela actors
Male actors from Baja California
21st-century Mexican male actors